Vellookkara  is a village in Thrissur district in the state of Kerala, India.

Demographics
 India census, Vellookkara had a population of 8019 with 3759 males and 4260 females.

References

Villages in Thrissur district